"Don't Back Down" is a song by the American rock band the Beach Boys and the final track on their 1964 album All Summer Long. Written by Brian Wilson and Mike Love, the lyrics describe a group of surfers who "don't back down from that wave", explaining that they "gotta be a little nuts" to show the girls "who's got guts". It was the group's last surfing-themed song until 1968's "Do It Again".

In 1990, an earlier version of "Don't Back Down" was included on a reissue CD that compiled Little Deuce Coupe and All Summer Long, and in 2014, a new stereo mix was featured on the archival release Keep an Eye on Summer. In 1996, punk rock band the Queers recorded a cover version of the song that served as the lead single for their album Don't Back Down.

Composition
The song, in the key of A-flat, modulates to the key of A during each chorus, and returns to A-flat during the verse. A modulation during the chorus had previously been used by Wilson in songs such as "Don't Worry Baby".

Critical reception

AllMusic critic Richie Unterberger called the track a "relatively little-known treasure" and praised it for its "uncommonly anxious lyrics." Music historian Andrew Hickey called the song "one of [All Summer Long's] best tracks." Musicologist Philip Lambert said that Don't Back Down' positively explodes with surfing energy and vitality."

Alternate version
An alternate version, sharing some of the elements of the final produced version, has a more serious tone. Lines such as "I know what it's like when you feel like backing down" and "Just grit your teeth, take it on, but don't back down!" give this version a personal, conversational and challenging direction.

Personnel
Per Craig Slownski.
The Beach Boys
Mike Love – lead, bass, backing, and harmony vocals
Al Jardine – backing and harmony vocals, electric bass guitars
Brian Wilson – chorus falsetto, backing, and harmony vocals; upright, tack, or grand piano; Hammond B3 organ; arranger
Carl Wilson – backing and harmony vocals, electric rhythm guitars
Dennis Wilson – backing and harmony vocals, drums
Additional musicians and production staff
Hal Blaine – drums
Chuck Britz – engineer
Ray Pohlman – 6-string electric bass guitar
The Honeys (Marilyn Rovell, Diane Rovell, Ginger Blake)  – backing vocals

References

1964 songs
The Beach Boys songs
Songs written by Brian Wilson
Songs written by Mike Love
Song recordings produced by Brian Wilson